Mocochinchi (from the Quechua for dried peach) is a Bolivian beverage.  It is made with peaches that have been peeled and dried. The fruits are left in water overnight, then boiled with sugar and cinnamon. The drink is served cold, and often, after finishing the drink, the peach is eaten.

See also
 Mote con huesillo

Sources

External links

Bolivian cuisine
Non-alcoholic drinks